Dicksonia thyrsopteroides Mett. is a species of tree ferns native to the island of New Caledonia (Nouvelle Caledonie) in the Pacific. It is a member of the family Dicksoniaceae.

References

Dicksoniaceae
Endemic flora of New Caledonia
Ferns of Oceania